Hambledon is a small village and civil parish in the county of Hampshire in England, situated about  north of Portsmouth within the South Downs National Park.

Hambledon is best known as the 'Cradle of Cricket'. It is thought that Hambledon Club, one of the oldest cricket clubs known, was formed about 1750.  Hambledon was England's leading cricket club from about 1765 until the formation of MCC (Marylebone Cricket Club) in 1787.

The famous Bat and Ball Inn in Hyden Farm Lane is next to the historic cricket ground at Broadhalfpenny Down where the Hambledon club originally played. The inn was run by Richard Nyren, who was also captain of the club. The modern Hambledon Cricket Club's ground is at Ridge Meadow, about 0 away.

Hambledon is a rural village surrounded by fields and woods. There are about 400 households with just under 1,000 residents.
The nearest villages are Clanfield, Denmead and Soberton.

Due to the climate and location Hambledon also has its very own vineyard, producing its own wine.

Education
There is a school, Hambledon Primary School, recently rated as 'Outstanding' by Ofsted.

Religious buildings
The parish church, St Peter's and St Paul's, has elements that date back to the Saxon period. The church was significantly expanded in the 13th century and a tower was added. The tower was rebuilt at the start of the 17th century and most recently in 1794. The church underwent a restoration in the 1870s.  Admiral Sir Erasmus Gower, governor of Newfoundland, is buried in the church. The regimental colours of the Hambledon Volunteers during the Napoleonic Wars hang over the south aisle. The Georgian old Vicarage is Grade II listed and noted for its fine Dutch gables.

Notable residents
Hambledon is the place of birth and death of William Lashly (1867–1940), a member of Robert Falcon Scott's Antarctic expeditions.

References

External links

Hambledon website

Hambledon